ZFF may refer to:

 Zagreb Film Festival, a Croatian film festival
 Zurich Film Festival, a Swiss film festival